Aliwal may refer to:

Aliwal, Taran Taran, a village in the Indian state of Punjab
Aliwal, Jalandhar, a village in the Indian state of Punjab
 Battle of Aliwal fought in 1846 between the British and the Sikhs
 Aliwal North, a town in central South Africa
 Aliwal South, another name for the Mossel Bay area of South Africa